The Annie Besant School is a school in Allahabad, Uttar Pradesh, India.

Located in Chhota Baghara, near the Prayag Railway, the school was established on 2 October 1926 by Annie Besant.

See also
Annie Besant

References

External links
 Annie Besant Girls Intermediate College Allahabad at SchoolsWorld.in

Schools in Allahabad
Educational institutions established in 1926
1926 establishments in India